The Search for the Ten Outstanding Red Cross Youth of the Philippines is an annual search for exceptional Red Cross Youth volunteers who have rendered unselfish service of excellence to the Philippine Red Cross. It aims to recognize the volunteers for their invaluable support and contribution to the PRC through the Red Cross Youth.

History
Launched in 2003, the first batch was awarded with a simple but meaningful ceremony on October 31 at the National Headquarters in Manila. With the initiative of the 14th National Youth Council Officers, the award system was improved and the search was renewed with the awarding of the 2006 TORCY onwards.

2003 Awardees

The awarding was held on October 31, 2003 at the National Headquarters of the Philippine Red Cross in Port Area, Manila.

2004 Awardees

The awarding was held at the National Headquarters of the Philippine Red Cross in Port Area, Manila.

2006 Awardees

2007 Awardees

2009 Awardees

The awarding was held at the Sky Dome, SM North EDSA, Quezon City.

2010 Awardees

The awarding was held on December 18, 2010 at Bayview Park Hotel, Roxas Boulevard, City of Manila.

References

External links
 Philippine Red Cross - Red Cross Youth Department
 RCY Volunteer Facebook
 Red Cross Youth Fan Page
 Red Cross Youth - Philippines Facebook Group

International Red Cross and Red Crescent Movement
Youth organizations based in the Philippines